2020 in Korea may refer to:
2020 in North Korea
2020 in South Korea